Liam Kearney (born 10 January 1983, Republic of Ireland), nicknamed "The Conna Maradona", is an Irish former professional footballer associated primarily with Cork City in the League of Ireland. As of 2021, Kearney was "Head of Academy" at Cork City FC.

Kearney played mainly on the left wing and represented the Republic of Ireland U21 team on seven occasions, scoring once.

Career

Nottingham Forest 
Kearney joined Nottingham Forest from Fermoy United after previously playing for Valley Rangers. He was the star of the Cork Schoolboys League Kennedy Cup team in 1998 and as a result signed with Nottingham Forest in 1999. Whilst with Forest, Kearney won the U19 FA Premier League. Kearney appeared many times for several of the underage Irish national teams, from U16 to U20. He played in the U16 European championships in Israel and finished 3rd in Norway in the U19 European Championships. He also attracted interest from Cheltenham manager Bobby Gould.

Cork City 
Kearney returned to Ireland in 2003, joining Cork City. In 2004, he made his Republic of Ireland U21 debut against Italian opposition. Kearney won seven U21 caps whilst with Cork scoring once in a 1–0 victory over Italy. 2005 saw Cork City and Kearney embark on a campaign that would ultimately see them win the league title on the final day, beating Derry City 2–0 in which Kearney scored the second goal. The club also progressed into the First Round of the UEFA Cup, having started as an unseeded side in the first qualifying round, eliminating FK Ekranas from Lithuania and the eventual Swedish champions Djurgårdens IF, before being knocked out by Slavia Prague. Kearney left Cork City for Shelbourne in 2006 following an offer from Dutch Premier Division side Heerenveen was denied to the disappointment of the player.

Shelbourne 
Kearney joined Shelbourne from the then league champions, Cork City, on a free transfer in January 2006. He was limited to few first team opportunities, making just 10 league appearances throughout the season, scoring once. Shelbourne manager Pat Fenlon agreed to a temporary freezing of Liam's contract whilst he took a few weeks away from football during the 2006 season to regain his hunger and focus. Kearney returned in time to take a left wing berth in a friendly against English Championship side Sunderland. Kearney failed to break into the first team upon his return, but was rewarded with his second league winners medal in two years, as Shelbourne clinched the title on the last day. He has described his time in Dublin as "disappointing".

Return to Cork City 
Kearney departed Shelbourne on 22 January 2007 to rejoin Cork City, signing a two-year contract. Later that year he criticised the club for not settling players' contracts. In August 2008 he said that, despite Cork City's poor financial position and difficulties in re-signing and paying its players, he would prefer to stay with the club. He scored the winning goal in Cork City's Setanta Sports Cup final win over Glentoran but because of City's failure to offer him a new contract due to financial turmoil, Kearney left for Derry City after being approached by Stephen Kenny.

Derry City 
Derry City signed Kearney on the first day of the 2009 January transfer window. He started off well to his career at the Brandywell, however he sustained a broken leg during a match in May against Galway United and was out for three months. By the end of July it was still unclear as to when he would return. He also missed Derry's UEFA Europa League games, which saw them knock out Skonto Riga and run CSKA Sofia close. He expressed his disappointment at not being able to participate in Europe however he said once he regained fitness he was looking forward to helping the Candystripes challenge for the League of Ireland title.

Waterford United 
Kearney signed for Waterford United in what was a significant coup for the club. He became a fans' favourite within his first 5 games scoring the winner against his old club Derry City in his second game. Kearney was a big influence in Waterford United's push for the promotion towards the end of the season. He scored 5 league goals and played 30 league games before leaving the club.

Dandenong Thunder SC 
Kearney signed for Australian Victorian Premier League side Dandenong Thunder SC in January 2011.

Return to Cork City 2014 
Kearney returned to Cork City FC at the start of the 2014 season from Avondale United, having been denied in joining halfway through the 2013 season due to amateur player regulations. He left the club after the 2015 season in which Cork City were runners up to Dundalk in both the Airtricity League Premier Division and FAI Cup.

International career 
Kearney represented the Republic of Ireland Under-16 team at the 2000 UEFA European Under-16 Football Championship and the Under-19 team at the 2002 UEFA European Under-19 Football Championship.

Coaching career
In his last year as a player, Kearney completed his UEFA B Licence and then moved to the United States after his retirement at the end of 2015, where he spent a year coaching full-time at Premier UK Soccer in Raleigh-Durham, North Carolina Area. In January 2017, he returned to Ireland and joined his last club, Cork City, as a first team coach. Kearney later also assumed the role of head coach of the club’s Under 17 side. On 17 December 2019 the club confirmed, that Kearney had decided to leave the club.

In March 2020, Kearney was hired as a sports and events coordinator for the Fota Island Resort hotel near Cork. In January 2021, Kearney took a role as "Head of Academy" with Cork City FC, having previously held coaching roles at Galway United.

Honours 
Cork City
League of Ireland: 2005
FAI Cup: 2007
Setanta Sports Cup: 2008

Shelbourne
League of Ireland: 2006

References

External links 
 Player history

1983 births
Living people
Republic of Ireland association footballers
Republic of Ireland under-21 international footballers
Republic of Ireland youth international footballers
League of Ireland players
Cork City F.C. players
Shelbourne F.C. players
Derry City F.C. players
Waterford F.C. players
Dandenong Thunder SC players
Association football midfielders
Cork City F.C. non-playing staff